Hannah Petty (born 17 May 1997) is an Australian netball player in the Suncorp Super Netball league, playing for the Adelaide Thunderbirds.

Petty began playing for the Thunderbirds in 2016 and has played for the South Australian-based team ever since. During her development, Petty was part of the South Australian Sport Institute Netball Program and was a member of the 2017 Under-21 Australian team. She was appointed co-captain of the Thunderbirds for the 2020 season, sharing the role with English netballer Chelsea Pitman.

References

External links
 Super Netball profile
 Netball Australia profile

1997 births
Australian netball players
Adelaide Thunderbirds players
Living people
Suncorp Super Netball players
Australian Netball League players
Southern Force (netball) players
Netball players from South Australia
People educated at Immanuel College, Adelaide
South Australian Sports Institute netball players